Kienan LaFrance (born May 16, 1991) is a professional Canadian football running back for the Saskatchewan Roughriders of the Canadian Football League (CFL). He made his professional debut for the Ottawa Redblacks, where he won the 104th Grey Cup in 2016, and has also been a member of the Winnipeg Blue Bombers.

Professional career

Ottawa Redblacks
LaFrance was drafted in the sixth round, 45th overall by the Ottawa Redblacks in the 2015 CFL Draft. He was officially signed on May 25, 2015. After minimal usage his rookie season, LaFrance developed into a rotational player on offense and special teams, especially when starting running back William Powell was lost to injury.

On November 20, 2016 in the postseason, LaFrance rushed for 157 yards and scored the game-winning touchdown to send the Redblacks back to the Grey Cup for the second straight season. Ottawa went on to win the Grey Cup, with LaFrance as the game's leading rusher with 42 yards on 11 carries, and also pitching in 31 receiving yards.

Saskatchewan Roughriders
On February 14, 2017, LaFrance signed with the Saskatchewan Roughriders (CFL). He dressed in 13 regular games and started six of them, recording 68 carries for 273 rushing yards and two touchdowns, as well as 14 catches for 119 receiving yards and one touchdown. He was released by the team on February 1, 2018 the day before the Roughriders were to pay LaFrance a $20,000 bonus as part of the final year of his contract; the original 2-year deal would have compensated LaFrance roughly $110,000 total per year.

Winnipeg Blue Bombers
On February 13, 2018, it was announced that LaFrance had signed with the Winnipeg Blue Bombers. It was a one-year contract for about $80,000. LaFrance provided insurance as a backup to Andrew Harris, who had helped recruit LaFrance to join Winnipeg. LaFrance scored 2 rushing touchdowns in 2018, in two separate games against Montreal.

Saskatchewan Roughriders (II)
After fulfilling his contract with Winnipeg, LaFrance rejoined the Roughriders for the 2019 season. LaFrance saw limited usage on offense, but was a notable contributor on special teams by making 15 tackles. He also caught a pass from punter Jon Ryan on a fake punt, but the play was negated due to a coaching clerical error. LaFrance continued to mostly contribute on special teams during the 2021 season, and on December 22, 2021 was rewarded with a two-year contract extension.

Career statistics

References

External links

Kienan LaFrance bio
 

1991 births
Living people
Canadian football running backs
Ottawa Redblacks players
Saskatchewan Roughriders players
Players of Canadian football from Manitoba
Canadian football people from Winnipeg
Winnipeg Blue Bombers players